Chillar is a village in India. Chillar may also refer to
Hondh-Chillar massacre on November 2, 1984 in Chillar village
Chillar Party, a 2011 Indian family comedy film
 Chíllar River, a river in the east of the Province of Málaga, Spain. 
Chillar (surname)